The CONCACAF Gold Cup is North America's major tournament in senior men's football and determines the continental champion. Until 1989, the tournament was known as CONCACAF Championship. It is currently held every two years. From 1996 to 2005, nations from other confederations have regularly joined the tournament as invitees. In earlier editions, the continental championship was held in different countries, but since the inception of the Gold Cup in 1991, the United States are constant hosts or co-hosts.

From 1973 to 1989, the tournament doubled as the confederation's World Cup qualification. CONCACAF's representative team at the FIFA Confederations Cup was decided by a play-off between the winners of the last two tournament editions in 2015 via the CONCACAF Cup, but was then discontinued along with the Confederations Cup.

Since the inaugural tournament in 1963, the Gold Cup was held 26 times and has been won by seven different nations, most often by Mexico (11 titles).

Costa Rica have won the inaugural CONCACAF Championship in 1963 and two more in 1969 and 1989. They are the third-most successful team behind CONCACAF's "big two", Mexico and the United States, both in terms of number of titles and ranking in the All-time Table. Since 2000, they have reached the knockout stage eleven times in a row. Since the inception of the CONCACAF Gold Cup in 1991, Costa Rica only reached the final once, but were beaten 2–0 by the United States in 2002.

Overall record

Winning tournaments

El Salvador 1963

Squad
Head coach:  Alfredo Piedra

First round

Results

Final round

Costa Rica 1969

In 1969, Costa Rica hosted the continental championship for their first and only time. The six qualified teams played each other once in a single group. Costa Rica won their first four matches, but were only one point ahead of Guatemala, which they faced directly in the last match. A 1–1 draw secured them the tournament victory in front of the home crowd.

Final round

1989 CONCACAF Championship

In the qualification for the tournament, Costa Rica were about to face the favored team from Mexico. However, before the matches were played, Mexico was disqualified and Costa Rica given a bye to the tournament stage.

In a group of five teams, home and away matches were played against each opponent. When Costa Rica were done with their eight matches in July, the United States still had four matches ahead of them, and were only trailing behind leaders Costa Rica by six points and three goals. However, the US team ended up drawing twice and only won the other two matches by one goal each. With that, Costa Rica won the tournament on account of better goal difference, four months after their own last match.

Final round

References

Countries at the CONCACAF Gold Cup
Costa Rica national football team